André Filipe de Oliveira, better known by the stage name Piruka (born March 4, 1993) is a Portuguese rapper.

Career 
In July 2021, he will perform at the first ever Rolling Loud festival in Europe which will have its first location in Portugal at Praia da Rocha, Portimão.

Discography

Albums

Singles

Notes 

Living people
1993 births
Portuguese rappers
21st-century Portuguese male singers